is a Japanese football player for Tochigi SC.

Club statistics
Updated to 23 February 2017.

References

External links

Profile at Tochigi SC

1994 births
Living people
Association football people from Osaka Prefecture
Japanese footballers
J1 League players
J2 League players
J3 League players
Matsumoto Yamaga FC players
Tochigi SC players
J.League U-22 Selection players
Association football midfielders